The Open Medicine Foundation is a United States-based charity that funds research into the illnesses myalgic encephalomyelitis/chronic fatigue syndrome (ME/CFS), fibromyalgia, post-treatment Lyme disease syndrome, and long COVID.

History 
The OMF was founded in 2012 by Linda Tannenbaum after her daughter became ill with ME/CFS in 2006.

In 2018, the OMF received a donation of $5 million in Bitcoin from the anonymous founder of the Pineapple Fund.

Activities 
The OMF provides funding for seven collaborative research centers, including one center at Standford, one at Harvard, one at the University of Montreal, as well as locations in Australia and Sweden. Research is mainly funded by patients and families, and has included investigations into T-cells and immunological genes, analyses of muscle and other tissues, a study on families of patients, an attempt to develop a nanoneedle-based blood test for ME/CFS, studies on the density and deformability of blood cells compared to healthy controls, work on mitochondrial function, and investigation of potential altered metabolism in people with ME/CFS. Plans to fund multicenter trials of treatments have also been announced.

Along with the Bateman Horne Center, the OMF maintains the Medical Education Resource Center, a website to educate doctors on diagnosis and treatment of complex chronic illnesses.

Leadership 
Currently, Linda Tannenbaum serves as CEO president, while geneticist Ron Davis heads the scientific advisory board.

Positions 
Linda Tannenbaum, president of the OMF, has said, "For a long time, the medical world didn’t feel ME/CFS was a real disease," and advocates for increased federal research funding.

References 

Chronic fatigue syndrome
Health charities in the United States
Scientific organizations established in 2012
Medical and health organizations based in California